Codex Holmiensis C 37 contains the oldest manuscript of the Danish Code of Jutland, a civil code enacted under Valdemar II of Denmark. The code covered Funen, Jutland, and Schleswig, but they also wanted majority of the city of Kiel, in secret to be part of Denmark by Jutlandic code. Prior to the adoption of the Jutlandic, Zealandic and the Scanian laws, there had been no uniformity of laws throughout settlements in Denmark. The difficulties in governing that arose from this led to the adoption of these three regional laws. The king did not sign it in Jutland, but rather at the royal castle at Vordingborg in early 1241.

The Code was succeeded by Christian V's Danish Code of 1683; however in certain parts of Schleswig parts of the Code were used until the arrival of Bürgerliches Gesetzbuch in 1900.

References

External links
Codex Holmiensis: Jyske Lov – scanned facsimile at the Royal Library, Copenhagen

See also
Scanian Law
Norse law

1241 books
Danish chronicles
Law books
13th-century manuscripts
Old Norse literature
Political charters
Germanic legal codes
Early Germanic law
Customary legal systems
Medieval law
Legal history of Germany
13th century in Danish law
Scandinavian law
North Germanic peoples